Transformers: Revenge of the Fallen is a 2009 science-fiction film.

Transformers: Revenge of the Fallen may also refer to:

 Transformers: Revenge of the Fallen (video game)
 Transformers Revenge of the Fallen: Autobots
 Transformers Revenge of the Fallen: Decepticons
 Transformers: Revenge of the Fallen – The Album
 Transformers: Revenge of the Fallen – The Score

See also
 Transformers (disambiguation)